Richard Wellesley (22 April 1787 – 1 March 1831) was an Anglo-Irish Member of Parliament.

He was the illegitimate son of Richard Wellesley, 1st Marquess Wellesley and his mistress (later wife) Hyacinthe-Gabrielle Roland and educated at Eton College (1800), Christ Church, Oxford (1805), and Lincoln's Inn (1808).

He represented Queenborough in Parliament from 1810 to 1812, East Grinstead from January to March 1812, and Ennis from 1820 to 1826. He was appointed one of the Lords Commissioners of the Treasury from January to June 1812 and Commissioner of Stamp Duties from 1812 to his death.

He married in 1821, Jane Eliza, the daughter of George Chambers of Hartford, Huntingdonshire. They had 4 sons and a daughter.

His papers are held at the University of Southampton.

Ancestors

References
http://www.historyofparliamentonline.org/volume/1790-1820/member/wellesley-richard-1787-1831
http://www.southampton.ac.uk/archives/cataloguedatabases/webguidemss63.html

External links 
 

Richard
1787 births
1831 deaths
People educated at Eton College
Alumni of Christ Church, Oxford
Members of Lincoln's Inn
Members of the Parliament of the United Kingdom for County Clare constituencies (1801–1922)
Members of the Parliament of the United Kingdom for English constituencies
UK MPs 1807–1812
UK MPs 1820–1826
English people of French descent